Holley is a village in the town of Murray in Orleans County, New York, United States. The population was 1,811 at the 2010 census. It is part of the Rochester Metropolitan Statistical Area.

History 
The village of Holley was incorporated in 1850. Originally named Saltport, the name was changed to honor Myron Holley, a commissioner of the Erie Canal.

The village of Holley hosted an annual "Hazzard County Squirrel Slam," from 2006 until the last event in 2016, a squirrel hunt that raises funds for the village's fire department. The event went off without incident for six consecutive years until the 2013 edition drew the sudden ire of a coalition of wildlife rehabilitators, animal rights activists and gun control advocates. Approximately 30 people stood outside of the Holley Fire Department to protest the event. Protests also occurred in 2014, 2015, and 2016. Several lawsuits to stop the event took place, none of which were successful. Due to controversy the "Squirrel Slam" hasn't taken place since 2016.

Geography

Holley is located on the Erie Canal.

The village is located at the junction of east-west highway New York State Route 31 (West Albion Street and State Street) and north-south highway New York State Route 237 (North and South Main Street).

Economy
Holley's main economy is farming based, due to the lack of trade in the area, as well as the growing townships nearby, such as Brockport and Albion. The town has small shops and businesses, including a dance studio, Kyokushin Karate dojo, a diner and gas station.

Education
There are two public schools in Holley: Holley Elementary School and Holley Junior/Senior High School. These two schools are located in close proximity to each other in the northeastern portion of the village.

Residents of the Holley School district currently pay the highest rate of school taxes in the county. The older high school, located in the center of town, was closed in 1976 due to a growing population that needed a larger facility and one closer to athletic fields. This building is now considered a historical landmark.

Demographics

As of the census of 2000, there were 1,802 people, 788 households, and 464 families residing in the village. The population density was 1,422.9 people per square mile (547.8/km2). There were 846 housing units at an average density of 668.0 per square mile (257.2/km2). The racial makeup of the village was 96.95% White, 1.22% African American, 0.11% Native American, 0.11% Asian, 0.72% from other races, and 0.89% from two or more races. Hispanic or Latino of any race were 2.61% of the population.

There were 788 households, out of which 32.7% had children under the age of 18 living with them, 42.0% were married couples living together, 12.6% had a female householder with no husband present, and 41.0% were non-families. 33.9% of all households were made up of individuals, and 13.5% had someone living alone who was 65 years of age or older. The average household size was 2.29 and the average family size was 2.95.

In the village, the population was spread out, with 26.5% under the age of 18, 8.5% from 18 to 24, 31.4% from 25 to 44, 21.4% from 45 to 64, and 12.2% who were 65 years of age or older. The median age was 35 years. For every 100 females, there were 96.5 males. For every 100 females age 18 and over, there were 93.1 males.

The median income for a household in the village was $36,367, and the median income for a family was $49,200. Males had a median income of $31,019 versus $23,077 for females. The per capita income for the village was $17,388. About 7.6% of families and 10.2% of the population were below the poverty line, including 15.5% of those under age 18 and 11.5% of those age 65 or over.

References

External links
  Holley Central schools
  Village of Holley
  Holley Village Police
  Holley Village Fire Department

Villages in New York (state)
Rochester metropolitan area, New York
Villages in Orleans County, New York